Connecticut's 137th House district is one of 151 Connecticut House of Representatives districts. It is represented by Kadeem Roberts. The district consists of part of the city of Norwalk.

List of representatives

Recent Election Results

2022

2020

See also 
 List of members of the Connecticut General Assembly from Norwalk

External links 
 Google Maps - Connecticut House Districts

References

137
Norwalk, Connecticut